The Hooded Hawk Mystery is Volume 34 in the original The Hardy Boys Mystery Stories published by Grosset & Dunlap.

This book was written for the Stratemeyer Syndicate by Charles S. Strong and rewritten by Harriet Adams. The original version of this book was shortened in 1971 by Priscilla Baker-Carr resulting in two slightly different stories sharing the same title.

Plot summary
The Hardy Boys solve a kidnapping and break up a gang smuggling illegal aliens from India who are also holding an Indian prince captive. An official of the Indian government saw to it that a trained peregrine falcon was delivered to the boys to use in their investigation. Throughout their mission the falcon intercepts many messages between the smugglers as the criminals use pigeons to fly messages from place to place.

Finally, the boys rescue the Indian prince and catch the human smugglers along with creating a strong bond between India and the Hardys.

References

The Hardy Boys books
1954 American novels
1954 children's books
1971 American novels
1971 children's books
Grosset & Dunlap books